Feolin (also known as Feolin Ferry) is a slipway on the west coast of Jura.  provides a vehicle and passenger ferry service from Port Askaig on Islay across the Sound of Islay, the only regular access to the island. The road on both islands has the designation A846.

History 
The name "Feolin" means "Field or stony place by the shore".

References

External links 

Feolin Study Centre

Jura, Scotland
Villages on Jura, Scotland